The Izzeddin Fortress (Izzeddin means "Glory of the Faith") is an Ottoman fortress in Souda Bay, Crete, near the village of Kalami, best known for its role as a prison for political prisoners in 20th-century Greece.

The fortress was established by the then Ottoman governor of the island, Rauf Pasha, in 1872, and named after the son of Sultan Abdülaziz. Already under the Cretan State (1898–1913) it was used as a prison, and continued so when Crete passed under Greek rule, until 1950. It was particularly notorious as a site of imprisonment for political prisoners, especially during the dictatorship of Theodoros Pangalos (1925–26) and the Greek Civil War. Its occupants included Eleftherios Venizelos in 1903 and the deposed dictator Theodoros Pangalos in 1926–28. After 1950 it passed under the jurisdiction of the Hellenic Navy. Today it is a protected landmark and a site for cultural events.

Notes

Buildings and structures completed in 1748
Ottoman fortifications in Greece
Ottoman Crete
Buildings and structures in Chania (regional unit)
Prisons in Greece
Castles in Crete
Souda Bay
18th-century architecture in Greece